George Douglas Forrester (22 May 1890 – 6 May 1959) was a Scottish first-class cricketer.

The son of Henry Forrester, he was born in the Edinburgh suburb of Colinton in May 1890. He was educated in England at Rugby School, before going up to University College, Oxford. While studying at Oxford, he played first-class cricket for Oxford University in 1912 and 1913, making a total of six appearances. Forrester scored a total of 235 runs in his six matches, at an average of 21.36 and with a high score of 82.

After graduating from Oxford, he travelled to British Burma to take up employment as an assistant at the Burma Oil Company. During the First World War, he was commissioned in April 1917 as a second lieutenant in the Rangoon Mounted Rifles. He later emigrated to Australia, where he died in May 1959 at Barwon Heads, Victoria.

References

External links

1890 births
1959 deaths
Cricketers from Edinburgh
People educated at Rugby School
Alumni of University College, Oxford
Scottish cricketers
Oxford University cricketers
Indian Army personnel of World War I
Scottish emigrants to Australia
Indian Defence Force officers